John Albert Ewart (April 20, 1872 – April 21, 1964) was a Canadian architect and son of Chief Dominion Architect David Ewart.

Personal and early years
Ewart was born in Ottawa on April 20, 1872, after his father's arrival in Canada. Ewart studied architecture at the University of Toronto in the 1890s.

Career
Eward moved to Ottawa to practice with King Arnoldi in 1895 and Burritt & Meredith in 1904, and Sproatt & Rolph in 1932. His buildings are built mostly in Ottawa with a few in nearby Pembroke, Ontario and Carleton Place, Ontario.

Death
Ewart died in Ottawa on April 21, 1964.

Portfolio
List of buildings designed by Ewart include:

 Booth Building, 1910–11
 Transportation Building, 1916
 Hunter Building, 1917–20
 Metropolitan Life Building, 1924-27 (associate of Waid)
 Ottawa Electric Building, 1926–27
 Victoria Building, 1927–28
 Architect to Ottawa Collegiate Institute Board
 Knox Presbyterian Church (Ottawa) 1932

Gallery

See also
John Ewart (architect)

References

1872 births
1964 deaths
Artists from Ottawa
Canadian architects